The Basilica of the National Shrine of Our Lady of Fatima is a Modernist minor basilica and US national shrine of the Roman Catholic Church, honoring the Blessed Virgin Mary as Our Lady of Fatima, the patroness of the United States. The shrine is directed by the  Barnabite Fathers. It is located at 1023 Swann Road in Lewiston, New York, USA, north of Niagara Falls.

History

In the mid-1950s the Catholic Polish and Italian communities in the Niagara Falls region joined together. They sought to support the Barnabite Fathers, a missionary order working the area.  The group set out to create a shrine dedicated to Our Lady of Fatima.

First among the many Shrine benefactors were Mr. and Mrs. Walter Ciurzak who, in 1954, donated  of their farmland for the construction of the Shrine.
in Lewiston.  At that time, the shrine began with just one humble statue of Our Lady of Fatima. Later, in 1960, the shrine that exists today was founded.

The church was started in 1963 and dedicated in 1965.

On October 7, 1975 Pope Paul VI conferred the title of basilica upon the church.  Thousands of pilgrims from around the country and the world visit the basilica each year.

Notable features

The basilica is located on 16 acres of land. The dome is covered with two layers of glass and acrylic glass depicting a contour of the Northern hemisphere.

A -tall bell tower was built during the 25th anniversary year, 1981, and is dedicated to the memory of Barnabite Father Charles M. Barlassina, who served at the shrine.

Other highlights include:

 A Shrine of St. Anthony Mary Zaccari
 The Little Chapel of Fatima
 The Avenue of Saints, where over one hundred life-size marble statues represent Saints from every race and walk of life are featured.
 A Shrine of Mother Cabrini

Renovation

In 2008, a $6 million renovation was undertaken.  It was the first major renovation and addition in over fifty years. The rector, Father Julio Ciavaglia of the Barnibite Fathers, collaborated with architects for the design of 7,400 sq.ft. of additional space.  The overall focus for this work brings the old world artisan experience with the use of granite stone walls, arched doorways, stained glass windows, structural wood beams and copper roofs to the shrine.

The renovation included a new ambulatory space around the front entrance to provide a separation between the main domed basilica and the exterior. This space provides an area for visitors to experience the basilica and the adjoining chapels without interrupting an ongoing service. The existing Sacristy along the rear of the building was removed and replaced with a 2,260 sq. ft. addition for small gatherings and to show the historical compilation of religious relics that have been collected by the Barnibite Fathers.

See also 
List of Catholic basilicas
Roman Catholic Diocese of Buffalo
Barnabites

References

External links
 Official Web Site
 Our Lady of Fatima Shrine Page at Barnabite Fathers website
 Our Lady of Fatima Shrine Page at New York Department of Economic Development website

20th-century Roman Catholic church buildings in the United States
Roman Catholic churches completed in 1965
1964 establishments in New York (state)
Shrines to the Virgin Mary
Basilica churches in New York (state)